Christopher DeFaria (born May 20, 1959) is an American film producer. He served as president of animation and innovative technology at Warner Bros. Pictures for four years. In January 2017, he joined DreamWorks Animation in the newly-created position of president of the DreamWorks Feature Animation Group. As president, DeFaria oversaw all aspects of DWA's feature animation business, including slate strategy, development, production; innovation and technology; and business affairs prior to his departure in early 2019.  

He is a graduate of UCLA, a member of the AMPAS and WGA and a founding member of FilmAid International. He serves on the board of the American Academy of Dramatic Arts.

Early life 
DeFaria was born on May 20, 1959 at San Francisco, California, United States. DeFaria began his Hollywood career in 1969 as a voice actor playing the part of Peppermint Patty in Peanuts TV specials from the same year until 1973.

Career 
DeFaria produced the film Tom & Jerry. 

Prior to establishing Keylight, Chris served as President of DreamWorks Animation where he led the studio’s creative development and technological advancement. Before that he was president of Digital Production and Innovative Technology at Warner Bros. where he founded Warner Animation Group, the studio’s animation division, developed VFX strategies for films like Harry Potter and the Matrix and oversaw initiatives in AI and VR.

Filmography

References

External links 
 

1959 births
American male child actors
American child singers
NBCUniversal people
DreamWorks Animation people
Film producers from California
Living people
Male actors from California
People from Alameda County, California
American people of Portuguese descent
People from San Francisco
Warner Bros. Discovery people
Warner Bros. people
Warner Bros. Animation people